Even So is an EP by Slovenly, released on 1984 through New Alliance Records.

Track listing

Personnel 
Slovenly
Steve Anderson – vocals
Rob Holtzman – drums
Lynn Johnston – saxophone
Tim Plowman – keyboards
Tom Watson – guitar, bass guitar
Scott Ziegler – guitar, bass guitar
Production and additional personnel
Richard Masci – production
Peter Slovenly – production

References 

1984 EPs
New Alliance Records EPs
Slovenly (band) albums